The 2006 IIHF World U18 Championship Division I were a pair of international under-18 ice hockey tournaments run by the International Ice Hockey Federation. The Division I tournaments made up the second level of competition at the 2006 IIHF World U18 Championships. The Group A tournament took place between 3 April and 9 April 2006 in Miskolc, Hungary and the Group B tournament took place between 2 April and 8 April 2006 in Riga, Latvia. Switzerland and Latvia won the Group A and Group B tournaments respectively and gained promotion to the Championship Division for the 2007 IIHF World U18 Championships. While Hungary finished last in Group A and South Korea last in Group B and were both relegated to Division II for 2007.

Group A tournament
The Group A tournament began on 3 April 2006 in Miskolc, Hungary. Austria, France, Kazakhstan and Slovenia all returned to compete in this years Division I tournament after missing promotion to the Championship Division at the previous years World Championships. Hungary gained promotion to Division I after finishing first in last years Division II Group B tournament and Switzerland was relegated from the Championship Division after failing to survive the relegation round at the 2005 IIHF World U18 Championship.

Switzerland won the tournament after winning four of their five games, finishing first in the group standings and gained promotion to the Championship Division for the 2007 IIHF World U18 Championships. Slovenia finished in second place after losing only to Switzerland and Kazakhstan finished in third place. Hungary finished in last place, managing to tie one of their games and lose the other four and were relegated back to Division II for the 2007 IIHF World U18 Championships. Matija Pintarič of Slovenia led the tournament in goaltending with a save percentage of 0.940, and was named the top goaltender by the IIHF directorate. Kazakhstan's Yevgeniy Rymarev was named as top forward and Marco Maurer of Switzerland was selected as top defenceman. France's Remy Rimann was the tournaments leading scorer with ten points, including five goals and five assists.

Standings

Fixtures
All times local.

Scoring leaders

List shows the top ten skaters sorted by points, then goals.

Leading goaltenders
Only the top five goaltenders, based on save percentage, who have played at least 40% of their team's minutes are included in this list.

Group B tournament
The Group B tournament began on 2 April 2006 in Riga, Latvia. Japan, Latvia, Poland and Ukraine all returned to compete in this years Division I tournament after missing promotion to the Championship Division at the previous years World Championships. South Korea gained promotion to Division I after finishing first in last years Division II Group A tournament and Denmark was relegated from the Championship Division after failing to survive the relegation round at the 2005 IIHF World U18 Championships.

Latvia won the tournament after winning all five of their games and gained promotion to the Championship Division for the 2007 IIHF World U18 Championships. Denmark finished second after losing only to Latvia and Japan finished in third place. South Korea finished in last place, managing only to tie one of their games and lose the other four and were relegated to Division II for the 2007 IIHF World U18 Championships. Arturs Dzelzs of Latvia led the tournament in goaltending with a save percentage of 0.948, and was named the top goaltender by the IIHF directorate. Denmark's Philip Larsen was named as top defenceman and Andris Džeriņš of Latvia was selected as top forward. Džeriņš also led the tournament in scoring with 13 points, including six goals and seven assists.

Standings

Fixtures
All times local.

Scoring leaders

List shows the top ten skaters sorted by points, then goals.

Leading goaltenders
Only the top five goaltenders, based on save percentage, who have played at least 40% of their team's minutes are included in this list.

References

IIHF World U18 Championship Division I
Latvian
I
International ice hockey competitions hosted by Hungary
International ice hockey competitions hosted by Latvia
IIHF World U18 Championship Division I